Ty Herndon is an American country music artist. His discography consists of six studio albums and 20 singles. Of his singles, three reached number 1 on the Hot Country Songs charts: "What Mattered Most", "Living in a Moment", and "It Must Be Love".

Studio albums

1990s

2000s and 2010s

Compilation albums

Holiday albums

Singles

1995–2000

2001–present

Other charted songs

Music videos

References 

Country music discographies
 
 
Discographies of American artists